Modia may refer to:

 Modia (gens), a family name
 HaModia, an Israeli newspaper
 Modia, a plural form of modius
 Modia, an alternative word for Godi media

See also

 
 Modi (disambiguation)
 Media (disambiguation)